You Resemble Me is a 2021 internationally co-produced drama film, directed by Dina Amer in her directorial debut, from a screenplay by Amer and Omar Mullick. It stars Lorenza Grimaudo, Ilonna Grimaudo, Mouna Soualem, Sabrina Ouazani, Dina Amer, Alexandre Gonin, Grégoire Colin and Zinedine Soualem. Spike Lee, Spike Jonze, Riz Ahmed and Alma Har'el serve as executive producers on the film.

It had its world premiere at the 78th Venice International Film Festival in the Venice Days section on September 8, 2021. It was released in the United States on November 4, 2022.

Plot
When two sisters are torn apart, the eldest struggles to find her identity.

Cast
 Lorenza Grimaudo as Young Hasna
 Ilonna Grimaudo as Young Mariam 
 Mouna Soualem as Adult Hasna
 Sabrina Ouazani as Adult Hasna #2
 Dina Amer as Adult Hasna #3
 Alexandre Gonin as Abdelhamid 
 Grégoire Colin as Foster Father
 Zinedine Soualem as Army Officer
 Agnès de Tyssandier as Foster Mother
 Sana Sri as Amina

Production
Dina Amer worked as a reporter for Vice News, and reported on the 2015 Saint-Denis raid, in which it was later found that the police report that Hasna Aït Boulahcen was a suicide bomber, was false. Boulachen's family was contacted by multiple journalists, but they chose to speak with Amer, who over the course of several years conducting 360 hours of interviews, with Boulahcen's family and friends, to write the screenplay and make it as accurate as possible. Amer wanted the film not to excuse Boulahcen's choice, but to explore radicalization and how she got there and prevent others from falling into the same traps. Amer walked away from a deal with a major studio in order to maintain her vision, as financiers preferred for the film to be a documentary.

Release
It had its world premiere at the 78th Venice International Film Festival in the Venice Days section on September 8, 2021. It was released in the Middle East in September 2022, by Front Row Filmed Entertainment. It was released in the United States on November 4, 2022, by Willa Productions. It was released in the United Kingdom and Ireland on February 3, 2023, by Modern Films.

Awards
The film has been well received in international film festivals. It won the Audience Award at the Red Sea Festival. It also won an unprecedented four awards at REC Tarragona, including the CineClub Jury Prize, the Young Jury Prize, and the Audience Award.

Reception

References

External links
 

2021 drama films
2021 films
American drama films
French drama films
Egyptian drama films
2021 directorial debut films
Films produced by Spike Lee
2020s American films
2020s French films